LocalLink 26 is a bus route operated by the Maryland Transit Administration in Baltimore between Mondawmin and Brooklyn. On southbound trips, the route departs from Mondawmin Metro Bus Bay 2, near the intersection of Reisterstown Road and Liberty Heights Avenue north of Mondawmin Mall in West Baltimore, and terminates at the South Baltimore Park & Ride near the intersection of South Hanover Street and Baltic Avenue. Northbound trips run in the opposite direction between these terminal stops.

LocalLink 26 is part of the MTA Frequent Bus Network, along with the 12 CityLink bus routes and LocalLink routes 22, 26, 29, 30, 54, and 80.

References

Maryland Transit Administration bus routes